Central Metro, officially Puratchi Thalaivar Dr. M.G. Ramachandran Central metro station, is an underground metro station in Chennai, India. It serves both lines of the Chennai Metro. On 31 July 2020, It has been named by Government of Tamil Nadu as Puratchi Thalaivar Dr. M.G. Ramachandran Central Metro to honor the All India Anna Dravida Munnetra Kazhagam founder and the former Chief Minister of Tamil Nadu M. G. Ramachandran.

The station

The station is an underground, two-level station on Poonamallee High Road in front of the Chennai Central railway station and the Ripon Building. The station is one of the two metro stations where Corridor I (Airport–Wimco Nagar) of the project will intersect with Corridor II (Chennai Central Metro–St Thomas Mount via Egmore and CMBT Metro), the other being the Alandur metro station. The metro station, being constructed at a depth of 28 m, will be the largest of all metro stations in the city with an area of over 30,000 sq m. The three-level metro station will cover a length of 410 metres and will have a width of 35 metres. Unlike the other metro stations which have four entry points, the Chennai Central Railway Station will have six entry/exit points for access to Park suburban and Park Town MRTS stations, Ripon Building, Rajiv Gandhi Government General Hospital, and Chennai Central railway station. The station will act as a transit point for passengers from the Chennai Central railway station, Park Town, and Park railway stations. It is estimated that more than 100,000 commuters will use the station daily.

The station is one of the few in the corridor that will have parking facilities. Space will be allocated for parking in a basement area for about 500 cars and 1,000 two-wheelers. There are also plans to have the airport check-in facility in one of the basement levels at the station, which will allow air passengers to complete the check-in procedures at the station itself. A bus bay has also been planned opposite the station.

The station is one of the three stations in the Chennai Metro Rail network that will have 230-kV receiving sub-stations for power supply from the state's electricity grid. The other two are Koyambedu and Arignar Anna Alandur Metro.

The station was opened on 25 May 2018. As of December 2019, the station had a daily footfall of about 9,500 passengers, up from about 7,700 in February 2019, making it the second busiest metro station in the city after Thirumangalam.

Station layout

Landscape

The Chennai Corporation has plans to develop a park over the Chennai Central Metro. Chennai Metro Rail Limited has agreed to a proposal by the Chennai Corporation of extending the Ripon Buildings Park over the Chennai Central underground metro station. Waterproof structures will be created over the station to facilitate the creation of the park. A portion of the park, which will cover more than six acres of the premises of Ripon Buildings and Victoria Public Hall, will be developed on a waterproof concrete slab area, measuring 210 metres by 10 metres. Visitors to the Ripon Buildings Park, Amma Maaligai and Victoria Public Hall will have access to the Chennai Central Metro through some of its seven entry points.

See also

 List of Chennai metro stations
 Railway stations in Chennai
 Rajiv Chowk metro station

References

External links
Official Website for Chennai Metro Rail Limited

Chennai Metro stations
Chennai Central railway station
Railway stations in Chennai